Sarum may refer to:

Places
either of two cities in Wiltshire, England:
 Salisbury formerly New Sarum
 Salisbury Cathedral
 Old Sarum, the ruins of old Salisbury
 Sarum (Newport, Maryland), a historic house in Newport, Maryland, United States
 Sarum Chase, a historic house in London, England
 Sirmaniyah or Sarmin, two villages in Syria identified as the possible birthplace of the Catholic saint John Maron

Religion
 Salisbury Cathedral, in England
 Sarum Rite, the major liturgical rite in England prior to the English Reformation
 Sarum, liturgical colours used in the Sarum Rite

Other uses 
 Sarum (beetle), a genus of beetles in the family Chrysomelidae
 Sarum (novel), a 1987 work of historical fiction
 Sarum, a style of cassock that is double-breasted with three buttons